Amy Domingues (born 1973) is an American viola da gamba player and cellist (baroque and modern).

Biography
She earned her master's degree in Early Music at Peabody Conservatory.  In August 2014  Domingues traveled to Venice, Italy at the invitation of the Venice Opera Project to play continuo in their inaugural season.

In addition to her early music activities, Domingues maintains a large teaching studio and performs on amplified viola da gamba with multi-instrumentalist Dennis Kane as the duo Domingues & Kane. She is also an active cellist, composer, and teacher in the Washington, DC area. Her soundtrack compositions can be heard in the score to 2003’s Academy Award-nominated documentary film The Weather Underground. She has released three cello-oriented rock albums under the name Garland of Hours, in addition to her contributions as a recording artist on over fifty rock, pop, and classical albums.

Collaborations
She has performed with the Washington Bach Consort, The Folger Consort, the National Philharmonic, Hesperus, Sonnambula (NYC), Faraquet, and is a founding member of Corda Nova Baroque. She has performed in masterclasses with Wieland Kuijken, Philippe Pierlot and Paolo Pandolfo.

Awards
She is a multiple recipient of the Peabody Career Development Grant and the Young Artist's Grant-in-Aid (from the Viola da Gamba Society).

References

External links 
 www.amydomingues.com
 www.sonnambula.org
 www.dominguesandkane.com
 Johns Hopkins Magazine Summer 2012: Rockin' The Viol
 AllMusic.com Artist Amy Domingues

1973 births
21st-century classical musicians
21st-century American women musicians
American cellists
American film score composers
American women film score composers
Living people
Peabody Institute alumni
Place of birth missing (living people)
Women cellists
21st-century cellists